General Sir Lionel Smith, 1st Baronet  (9 October 1778 – 2 January 1842) was a British diplomat, colonial administrator, and soldier.

Life
His mother was noted writer and feminist Charlotte Smith. His father was Benjamin Smith, and his paternal grandfather was Richard Smith, a wealthy merchant and slave-owner.

In 1821, General Smith, then serving in the Bombay Army, commanded a punitive campaign against the Bani Bu Ali tribe in Oman. Lionel Smith was Governor of Tobago in 1833 and then Governor of Barbados (1833–1836), Viceroy of the colony of Windward Islands (which then included Grenada) from 1833 to 1836. He was awarded a baronetcy on 19 July 1838 for his service as Governor of Jamaica from 1836 to 1839.

During his governorship, the United Kingdom passed the Abolition Act that stated that slavery "shall be and is hereby utterly abolished and unlawful". On 1 August 1838, Governor Sir Lionel read the Proclamation of Freedom to a crowd of 8,000 at the Celebration of emancipation in the Square of Spanish Town, the then capital of Jamaica. The day has since been a day of celebration on Jamaica and a public holiday since 1893.

He was made Colonel of the 96th Regiment of Foot from 1832 to 1834 and later of the 40th Regiment of Foot from 1837 for life.

He left Jamaica in 1839 having run into difficulties with the passing of the Prisons Act and dissolving Jamaica's Assembly. Lionel Town, Clarendon is named after the Governor.

He was the fifth Governor of Mauritius from 16 July 1840 to 2 January 1842.

Family
Smith was twice married:

With his first wife, Ellen Marianne (d. 1814), daughter of Thomas Galway of Killery, co. Kerry, he had two daughters, Ellen Maria and Mary Anne. 
On 20 November 1819 he married Isabella Curwen, youngest daughter of Eldred Curwen Pottinger of Mount Pottinger, co. Down, and sister of Sir Henry Pottinger. She died three days after her husband, leaving four children, Lionel Eldred, Augusta, Isabella, and Charlotte. Isabella married George Floyd Duckett in 1845.

References

External links
 The Road to Freedom, Jamaica Gleaner
 Emancipation in the Jamaica Archives
 Prorogation of the Jamaica Assembly, History of Europe by Archibald Alison

Attribution

|-

|-

|-

1778 births
1842 deaths
Baronets in the Baronetage of the United Kingdom
British Army generals
Governors of the Windward Islands
Governors of Barbados
Governors of Jamaica
Governors of British Tobago
Knights Grand Cross of the Order of the Bath